Why the Long Face is the seventh studio album by Scottish band Big Country, released in 1995. It was produced by Chris Sheldon and members of the band.

The album received a reissue as a deluxe four-disc box-set by Cherry Red Records in 2018. In addition to a remaster of the original album on disc one, the three additional CDs contain demos, B-sides and single edits, as well as the band's 1996 live album Eclectic.

Background
Why the Long Face was recorded between August 1994 and January 1995. The new material was met with a lukewarm response from the head of the band's label Compulsion, Chris Biggs, who felt the band needed to do more work on the material. Compulsion ended up dropping Big Country and the band subsequently signed to Transatlantic in March 1995, with Why the Long Face being released on the label in June 1995.

Speaking to The Lennox Herald in 1995, lead vocalist and guitarist Stuart Adamson said of the album, "I think that this album flows well and that there is no filler on it. It's strong enough for us to do most of it live on stage." He added to the Evening Herald, "It's not a departure from or a return to anything really. This time round though, I think the songs are more intimate and personal as opposed to being about big impersonal issues. They've got real characters, strong verses and choruses."

Critical reception

On its release, Neil McKay of Sunday Life felt Why the Long Face failed to meet the same standard as The Buffalo Skinners. He wrote, "Solid and workmanlike, it lacks real inspiration. 'Sail into Nothing', 'God's Great Mistake', 'Wildland in My Heart' and 'Blue on a Green Planet' all try hard, but diminishing returns seem to be setting in." Chris Heath of The Daily Telegraph described the album as "rather good" and noted, "It was with minimal interest that I put on their new album, and with astonishment that I heard tune after tune of the sort which, if they had released them in 1987, would have saved their career."

Track listing

Original release (1995)

Cherry Red deluxe edition (2018)

Disc One – Why the Long Face

Disc Two – Bonus Tracks

Disc Three – Eclectic

Disc Four – Demos

Charts

Personnel
Stuart Adamson - guitar, e-bow, slide guitar, B-Bender guitar, lead vocals
Mark Brzezicki - drums, percussion, backing vocals
Tony Butler - bass guitar, backing vocals
Bruce Watson - guitar, e-bow, mandolin

Additional personnel
Josh Phillips - keyboards
James McNally - low whistle on "God's Great Mistake"

References

Big Country albums
1995 albums
Transatlantic Records albums